The 1936 United States presidential election in Connecticut was held on November 3, 1936, as part of the 1936 United States presidential election. The state voters chose eight electors to the Electoral College, who voted for president and vice president. As of 2020 this is the last election that Connecticut voted to the left of next-door Rhode Island.

Connecticut voted for Democratic Party candidate and incumbent President Franklin D. Roosevelt, who won the state by a margin of 14.97%. As of 2022, this is the most recent occasion that Connecticut voted to the left of neighboring Rhode Island and to the right of Nebraska.

Results

By county

See also
 United States presidential elections in Connecticut

References

Connecticut
1936
1936 Connecticut elections